Mindanao State University, commonly referred to as MSU Main, is a regional state, coeducational, research higher education institution in the city of Marawi, Philippines. Founded in 1961, it is the flagship and the largest campus of the Mindanao State University System.

MSU Marawi Campus has distinctions as the Regional Science Training Center, the Regional Carabao Center, and one of the country's Center of Excellence in Teacher Education and Center of Development for Information Technology. The university has a mandate to integrate the Christians, Moros, and Lumads of Mindanao.

History
Mindanao State University (MSU) was established on September 1, 1961, through RA 1387, as amended. It was the brainchild of the late Senator Domocao Alonto, as one of the government's responses to the so-called “Mindanao Problem”.

The original mission of the university was anchored on instruction, research, and extension. The 1954 Congressional Committee conceptualized it as a social laboratory for national integration.

The main campus in Marawi City which started with 282 students and 12 faculty members in its pioneering classes in 1962, has now grown to a multi-campus supra-regional university system, serving over 69,000 students in all levels with nearly 3,100 faculty members.

It is the only university directly charged by the government to advance the cause of national unity and actively pursue integration through education.

Today, MSU has units in areas which cut across the Mindanao regions. From a one campus university in Marawi City, MSU has grown to a multi-campus university of eight autonomous campuses: MSU-Main in Marawi City, MSU-IIT in Iligan City, MSU-TCTO in Tawi-Tawi, MSU-Naawan in Misamis Oriental, MSU-Maguindanao, MSU-General Santos, MSU-Sulu in Jolo, and MSU Buug in Zamboanga Sibugay.

The mandates of the university are:
 To perform the traditional functions of a university namely: instruction, research and extension service.
 To help accelerate the program of the integration among the peoples of Southern Philippines, particularly the Muslims and other cultural minorities.
 To provide trained manpower skills and technical know-how for the economic development of the Mindanao, Sulu and Palawan (MINSUPALA) region in Bangsamoro.

The initial batch of students to enroll in the University on June 13, 1962, passed the scholarship examination administered by the National Science Development Board. The 282 freshmen students were in the top 5% of their high schools in the MINSUPALA region in Bangsamoro. Their teachers were 12 regular Filipino faculty members and a number of volunteers from the U.S. Peace Corps, British Voluntary Service Overseas, Volunteers in Asia, Ford Foundation, Fulbright Foundation and others. Baccalaureate courses were offered by the pioneering colleges: Liberal Arts, Education and Community Development to which four more were added in the subsequent school year 1964-65 – Agriculture, Fisheries, Business Administration and Engineering. In July 1969, the College of Forestry was added.

To meet the growing demands of the region, 16 major colleges were created offering 248 courses.

On January 10, 2001, three CHED supervised institutions — Lanao Norte Agricultural College (LNAC), Lanao National College of Arts & Trade (LNCAT), and Maigo School of Arts and Trade (MSAT) — were integrated into the MSU System by virtue of CHED Order No. 27 S. 2000 and Republic Act No. 8760.

Classes were temporarily suspended due to the Battle of Marawi which started in May 2017. Some students, faculty, and personnel were evacuated to nearby MSU-IIT in Iligan City while others went home to their provinces during the ongoing conflict. The school was unable to hold summer classes in the campus. However, regular in-campus classes resumed in August of the same year after a successful "Balik MSU: Somombak Tano sa Pantaw a Mareg" campaign to allow faculty and students to return to the campus amidst the ongoing war with security being strictly monitored. The battle in the city officially ended later in October.

Colleges and schools 

 College of Agriculture (COA)
 College of Business Administration and Accountancy (CBAA)
 College of Education (CED)
 College of Engineering (COE)
 College of Fisheries (COF)
 College of Forestry and Environmental Studies (CFES)
 College of Health Sciences (CHS)
 College of Hospitality and Tourism Management (CHTM)
 College of Information Technology (CIT)
 College of Law (COL): It has two extensions in Iligan City and General Santos City.
 College of Medicine (COM) — in Iligan City
 College of Natural Sciences and Mathematics (CNSM)
 College of Public Affairs (CPA)
 College of Social Sciences and Humanities (CSSH)
 College of Sports, Physical Education and Recreation (CSPEAR)
 Institute of Science Education - Science High School (ISED-SHS)
 Integrated Laboratory School (ILS)
 King Faisal Center for Islamic, Arabic and Asian Studies (KFCIAAS)
 Graduate Studies (GS)
 Senior High School

Autonomous campuses

Bangsamoro
 Mindanao State University (Main Campus) in Marawi
 Mindanao State University–Maguindanao
 Mindanao State University–Sulu
 Tawi-Tawi College of Technology and Oceanography  
Northern Mindanao
 Iligan Institute of Technology
 Mindanao State University–Naawan
Soccsksargen
 Mindanao State University–General Santos City
Zamboanga Peninsula
 Mindanao State University–Buug

References

External links 
 MSU - Main Campus official website 
 
 
 
 
Mindanao State University College of Medicine

 
State universities and colleges in the Philippines
Mindanao Association State Colleges and Universities Foundation
Philippine Association of State Universities and Colleges
Research universities in the Philippines
Education in Marawi
Universities and colleges in Lanao del Sur
1961 establishments in the Philippines
Educational institutions established in 1961